VG, vg or v.g. may refer to:

Arts and media
 VG Cats, a webcomic
 VG-lista, the official Norwegian singles chart
 Vanguard: Saga of Heroes, an MMORPG computer game released in 2007
 Variable Geo, a series of hentai fighter arcade games
 Verdens Gang, a Norwegian newspaper
 Victory Gundam, short for Kidou Senshi Victory Gundam, a 1993 anime series
 Video game
 Világgazdaság, a Hungarian economic daily

Businesses and organizations
 VG (shop), a now-defunct chain of retail stores in the United Kingdom
 VG Airlines, a defunct Belgian airline
 Victoria Gardens (Rancho Cucamonga), an open-air retail center in Rancho Cucamonga, California, USA
 VLM Airlines (1993–2018, IATA code VG)
 Vonage (NYSE stock symbol GV)
 Air Siam (1965–1976, IATA code VG)

Military
 Volksgrenadier, the designation of some German infantry units in World War II
 VG (nerve agent), the NATO designation for a chemical weapon agent, a.k.a. Amiton

Religion
 Vicar general, the principal deputy of a Christian bishop
 Virgin (Vg), following the name of a Christian saint

Places
 ISO 3166-2:VG, the ISO 3166-2 country code for the British Virgin Islands

Science and technology
 .vg, the country code top-level domain for the British Virgin Islands
 Nissan VG engine, a car engine built by Nissan
 Variable geometry, a wing/aircraft configuration 
 Vegetable glycerine, otherwise known as glycerol
 Vein of Galen, two blood vessels in the cerebrum
 Vestigial wings, a gene in Drosophila melanogaster genetics
 Viral Genome, a unit used indicate concentration of Viral vector in Gene Therapy, usually a ratio to weight
 Voice grade category 3 cable
 Volume group, an administrative unit of storage volumes in logical volume manager (LVM) in Linux computer operating system
 Vortex generator, an aerodynamic surface used to create vortexes and delay flow separation

Other uses
 Verbi gratia, Latin expression meaning "for example"
 "Very good", in abbreviation
 British Virgin Islands (ISO 3166-1 country code VG)
Volcanic glass, a material